Karandagolla is a village in Sri Lanka. It is located within Central Province.

Poramadulla Central College was previously located in Karandagolla. It had opened there in 1901.

See also

List of towns in Central Province, Sri Lanka

References

External links

Populated places in Kandy District